Membranipora is a genus of bryozoans in the family Membraniporidae. A typical example is the widely distributed species Membranipora membranacea that commonly encrusts seaweeds, particularly fronds of the kelps Laminaria digitata, L. hyperborea, and Saccorhiza polyschides.

Colonies of M. membranacea show different forms of polyphenism as spines, tower zooids, chimneys and stolons.

Reproduction 
The eggs of M. membranipora develop into planktonic cyphonautes larvae which is strongly triangular in outline and about 850μm x 600μm big.

Species
Species:

Membranipora aborescens
Membranipora aculeata 
Membranipora acuminata 
Membranipora acuum 
Membranipora aedificata 
Membranipora aequalis 
Membranipora aftonensis 
Membranipora aftonia 
Membranipora albensis 
Membranipora albida 
Membranipora allita 
Membranipora almerai 
Membranipora alveolus 
Membranipora ambigua 
Membranipora ameghinoi 
Membranipora americana 
Membranipora ampla 
Membranipora ancarteri 
Membranipora angulosa 
Membranipora aperta 
Membranipora aperta 
Membranipora arborea 
Membranipora arcana 
Membranipora arcana 
Membranipora arcifera 
Membranipora arctica 
Membranipora arenulata 
Membranipora areolata 
Membranipora argus 
Membranipora artini 
Membranipora atabekjani 
Membranipora aviculifera 
Membranipora baccata 
Membranipora baculina 
Membranipora bellis 
Membranipora bemensis 
Membranipora benjamini 
Membranipora berthelseni 
Membranipora biarritziana 
Membranipora bifoliata 
Membranipora bioculata 
Membranipora bipunctata 
Membranipora bispinosa 
Membranipora boulei 
Membranipora bramensis 
Membranipora branscombensis 
Membranipora bruennichi 
Membranipora brunnea 
Membranipora bueltenensis 
Membranipora bulbillifera 
Membranipora californica 
Membranipora calveti 
Membranipora camillae 
Membranipora caminosa 
Membranipora canalifera 
Membranipora canui 
Membranipora canui 
Membranipora capillimargo 
Membranipora cauveri 
Membranipora cavernifera 
Membranipora celsospinata 
Membranipora cenomana 
Membranipora cervicornis 
Membranipora chyngtonensis 
Membranipora cingulata 
Membranipora claudata 
Membranipora clavicella 
Membranipora claviformis 
Membranipora clio 
Membranipora cochlearis 
Membranipora combesi 
Membranipora commixta 
Membranipora complanata 
Membranipora composita 
Membranipora conficiens 
Membranipora contexta 
Membranipora contracta 
Membranipora convexa 
Membranipora coronata 
Membranipora crassimargo 
Membranipora crespinae 
Membranipora cristallina 
Membranipora cubitalis 
Membranipora cuckmerensis 
Membranipora cuculligera 
Membranipora cyclopora 
Membranipora cyclostoma 
Membranipora deborahae 
Membranipora declivis 
Membranipora dennanti 
Membranipora dimorphocella 
Membranipora disjuncta 
Membranipora distefanoi 
Membranipora dolina 
Membranipora dorbignyana 
Membranipora dubia 
Membranipora dugossonei 
Membranipora dutertrei 
Membranipora duvergieriae 
Membranipora eastonensis 
Membranipora ebeidii 
Membranipora echinata 
Membranipora eleanorae 
Membranipora elizabethiensis 
Membranipora elliptica 
Membranipora endozooecialis 
Membranipora eocena 
Membranipora evanescens 
Membranipora excavata 
Membranipora falloti 
Membranipora famelica 
Membranipora fannia 
Membranipora fascelis 
Membranipora fastigii 
Membranipora faustina 
Membranipora faviola 
Membranipora fecampensis 
Membranipora fenestralis 
Membranipora fenestrella 
Membranipora fissura 
Membranipora fistula 
Membranipora flabellata 
Membranipora flabellata 
Membranipora flicki 
Membranipora fluonia 
Membranipora fonteia 
Membranipora fornicina 
Membranipora fossata 
Membranipora fossulifera 
Membranipora frontalis 
Membranipora fulcra 
Membranipora galeria 
Membranipora galvia 
Membranipora gardiana 
Membranipora gentili 
Membranipora gerana 
Membranipora germana 
Membranipora gharanensis 
Membranipora gigantea 
Membranipora gigantissima 
Membranipora girondina 
Membranipora globulosa 
Membranipora granti 
Membranipora gravensis 
Membranipora harmeri 
Membranipora hastingi 
Membranipora hebens 
Membranipora hennei 
Membranipora heterospinosa 
Membranipora hexagona
Membranipora hursleiensis 
Membranipora hyadesi 
Membranipora impolita 
Membranipora impressa 
Membranipora impressata 
Membranipora inaequalis 
Membranipora incurvata 
Membranipora inornata 
Membranipora insultans 
Membranipora intricata 
Membranipora irregularis 
Membranipora isabelleana 
Membranipora kayeum 
Membranipora kiowana 
Membranipora kischenewensis 
Membranipora krimskojensis 
Membranipora lacrymopora 
Membranipora laevigata 
Membranipora laevissima 
Membranipora lata 
Membranipora leo 
Membranipora ligeriensis 
Membranipora ligulata 
Membranipora limbata 
Membranipora limburgensis 
Membranipora longifissa 
Membranipora longipes 
Membranipora maastrichtensis 
Membranipora magnispina 
Membranipora malaccensis 
Membranipora mamillaris 
Membranipora mamillifera 
Membranipora maplestonei 
Membranipora margaritifera 
Membranipora marssoni 
Membranipora marssoniana 
Membranipora maxima 
Membranipora meandrina 
Membranipora megapora 
Membranipora membranacea 
Membranipora meunieri 
Membranipora meunieri 
Membranipora minuscula 
Membranipora morningtoniensis 
Membranipora munda 
Membranipora nanula 
Membranipora nellioides 
Membranipora nellioides 
Membranipora nicklesi 
Membranipora nitidula 
Membranipora nobilis 
Membranipora nordgaardiana 
Membranipora operculata 
Membranipora orbavicularia 
Membranipora orlowi 
Membranipora ornata 
Membranipora osburni 
Membranipora ossuaria 
Membranipora ovalis 
Membranipora ovata 
Membranipora ovifera 
Membranipora ovigera 
Membranipora pachundakii 
Membranipora pachytheca 
Membranipora pallaryi 
Membranipora palpebra 
Membranipora papyracea 
Membranipora parvicella 
Membranipora parvula 
Membranipora patellaris 
Membranipora paucispinata 
Membranipora pegma 
Membranipora pererrans 
Membranipora perincerta 
Membranipora perspicata 
Membranipora pertenera 
Membranipora pervinquierei 
Membranipora philostracites 
Membranipora plebicola 
Membranipora plicatella 
Membranipora plicatelloides 
Membranipora pollex 
Membranipora polystachys 
Membranipora pontpourqueyensis 
Membranipora portus 
Membranipora praetermissa 
Membranipora pratensis 
Membranipora princeps 
Membranipora proboscinoides 
Membranipora procurrens 
Membranipora pseudelea 
Membranipora pseudonormaniana 
Membranipora pudica 
Membranipora pulchella 
Membranipora pygmaea 
Membranipora pyriformis 
Membranipora pyropersiata 
Membranipora quadrata 
Membranipora quadrata 
Membranipora quadrifascialis 
Membranipora ravni 
Membranipora raymondi 
Membranipora regularis 
Membranipora reticularis 
Membranipora reyti 
Membranipora rimulata 
Membranipora roemeri 
Membranipora rotundicella 
Membranipora royana 
Membranipora rupensis 
Membranipora rustica 
Membranipora sandalina 
Membranipora santonensis 
Membranipora scanica 
Membranipora scotneiensis 
Membranipora seafordensis 
Membranipora securigera 
Membranipora selandica 
Membranipora semilunaris

References 

 Okamura, B. and J.C. Partridge (1999). "Suspension feeding adaptations to extreme flow environments in a marine bryozoan." Biol. Bull. 196: 205–215
 Padilla, D. K. and C. D. Harvell (1996). "Inducible aggression and intraspecific competition for space in a marine bryozoan, Membranipora membranacea". Limnol. Oceanogr. 41: 505–512
 Stricker, S. A., C. G. Reed & R.L. Zimmer (1988a). The cyphonautes larva of the marine Bryozoan Membranipora membranacea. 1. General morphology, body wall, and gut. Can. J. Zool. 66: 368–383.
 Stricker, S. A., C. G. Reed & R.L. Zimmer (1988b). The cyphonautes Larva of the Marine Bryozoan Membranipora membranacea. 2. Internal sac, musculature, and pyriform organ. Can. J. Zool. 66: 384–398.

Bryozoan genera
Cheilostomatida